Linepithema iniquum is a species of ant in the genus Linepithema. Described by Mayr in 1870, the species is endemic to South America and invasive in Europe.

References

Dolichoderinae
Hymenoptera of South America
Hymenoptera of Europe
Insects described in 1870